Kara Tepe (from Turkish for "black hill") is located in the area of Mavrovouni (in Greek it in means black mountain) about 2.5 km north of Mytilene, the capital of the island of Lesbos. The camp is managed by the Municipality of Mytilene and UNHCR in collaboration with the NGOs that operate there. The Site Manager is Mr. Michail Batzakis. 

The purpose of the camp is to provide temporary housing for asylum seekers as they await their registration processes. Kara Tepe was the overflow site for Moria Refugee Camp, the main registration center in Greece, and Europe's biggest refugee camp, known as a 'hotspot' established by the Greek government through which new arrivals would be processed. Initially, refugees were mandated to spend a minimum of 25 days in the Moria camp before being transferred to Kara Tepe, however due to the overcrowding of the Moria camp, most stayed much longer.

Kara Tepe's mandate is to accommodate vulnerable families. The majority of individuals living in the camp are of Afghani, Iraqi or Syrian origin. According to a survey conducted in December 2016, asylum seekers spent an average of four months at the Kara Tepe camp. Asylum seekers living in Kara Tepe are able to leave and reenter the site daily. The services at the site are run, in large part, by several NGOs, among them: IRC, Médecins du Monde, METAdrasi, SOS Villages, Caritas, Movement on the Ground and Because we Carry. Médecins Sans Frontières has a clinic in Mytilini that serves patients from the Kara Tepe camp who are referred to them by outreach teams.

While Kara Tepe has been lauded for its infrastructure and community-like atmosphere, the residents of Kara Tepe and the administration of the camp still face a great deal of challenges. Such challenges include: inadequate access to electricity, limited space and resources for food preparation, restrictions on employment, and lack of targeted mental health interventions for youth.

In August 2017, Kara Tepe's accommodation capacity was expanded by 56% to make room for up to 1300 persons. UNHCR reported that 260 new accommodation units had been installed at the camp in 2017.

After the September 2020 fire destroyed the Moria camp, Kara Tepe became the main camp on Lesbos for refugees and asylum seekers. The Greek government then approved the construction of a new closed reception centre at Vastria (near the village of Nees Kydonies) to be completed by late 2021.

See also 
 Moria refugee camp
 Pikpa camp
 Temporary Kara Tepe Refugee Camp

References 

Syrian refugee camps
Refugee camps in Lesbos
European migrant crisis